Stuffed ribs is a dish from the Diyarbakir. The ingredients are ribs of a one-year-old kid or lamb, shank meat, rice, butter, black pepper, salt, allspice, water, almonds, pepper paste, parsley or basil.

References

Turkish cuisine dolmas and sarmas
Lamb dishes